Moberly is a surname.

Moberly may also refer to:

Places 
 Moberly, Indiana
 Moberly, Kentucky
 Moberly, Missouri
 Moberly Lake (disambiguation), multiple locations

Other uses
 USS Moberly (PF-63), World War II frigate